Mont Orignal is a ski mountain about 100 km south of Quebec City, Canada in the region of Bellechasse near the village of Lac-Etchemin.

Description
Mont Orignal is a winter resort located not far from Lac Etchemin. It offers many winter activities like alpine skiing, cross-country skiing (54 km of classic / free skating trail) and snow tubing (three runs).  Mont Orignal also offers the possibility to rent fully equipped cottage. Mont Orignal is the world's first mountain to be equipped with a high-speed six pack chairlift, which was built in 1991. Mont Orignal is also one of only three mountains in Quebec to have a high-speed six pack along with Le Relais' 2016-built chairlift, and Sommet Saint-Sauveur's 2019 Sommet Express lift (if excluding Orford's and Bromont's 6/8 hybrid lifts). It maintains the largest snowpark in the province of Quebec. Several competitions were held in Moose Park (Mont Orignal snowpark) like the Jib Academy, a competition for teens under 16 years.

A shuttle service links many cities of the south shore of the St.Lawrence to the station: the "Ski-Bus du Mont-Orignal".

See also
 Mont-Sainte-Anne
 Stoneham
 List of ski areas and resorts in Canada

References

External links
 Mont Orignal
 Mont Orignal Snow Park

Ski areas and resorts in Quebec
Geography of Chaudière-Appalaches
Tourist attractions in Chaudière-Appalaches